Reg Plummer may refer to:
 Reg Plummer (field hockey)
 Reg Plummer (rugby union)